Groves is a city in Jefferson County, Texas, United States. The population was 17,335 at the 2020 census. It is part of the Beaumont–Port Arthur Metropolitan Statistical Area.

History
It was in that same general area around 1911 that John Warne Gates purchased additional tracts of land. The land was conveyed to the Griffing brothers of Port Arthur in 1916, and three years later Griffing Brothers Nursery employee Wiley Choate supervised the planting of several thousand pecan trees on a  tract. In 1921, the Port Arthur Land Development Company took control of the site and divided the land into a residential subdivision known as "Pecan Grove". The name was later changed to "Groves", after development representative and pioneer Port Arthurian Asa Groves.

A post office was established in 1927 and a school opened in 1929. A public library opened the following year. The community rapidly developed as a stop on the Kansas City Southern Railway. The Atlantic Refinery began operating in 1936. In 1940, a public water system was installed in the community. Several civic organizations, including the Lions Club, Chamber of Commerce, and Volunteer Fire Department, were formed during the 1940s. By the early 1950s, Groves had an estimated population of 1,300. In 1952, residents of the community voted 1,079–262 in favor of incorporating Groves as a city. Rapid population growth followed, surpassing 17,000 in the 1960 census and reaching 18,067 by 1970. During the remainder of the 20th century, the population slowly declined. In 2000, Groves was the fourth-largest city in Jefferson County, after Beaumont, Port Arthur, and Nederland.

Geography
Groves is located in eastern Jefferson County at  (29.947113, –93.915829). The city of Port Arthur borders Groves on three sides (southeast, southwest, and northeast), while Port Neches lies to the northwest. Three State Highways – 73, 87, and 347 – pass through or near the city.

Demographics

As of the 2020 United States census, there were 17,335 people, 5,747 households, and 3,851 families residing in the city.

As of the census of 2000, there were 15,733 people, 6,182 households, and 4,512 families residing in the city. The population density was 3,036.7 people per square mile (1,172.7/km2). There were 6,570 housing units at an average density of 1,268.1/sq mi (489.7/km2). The racial makeup of the city was 93.46% White, 1.32% African American, 0.26% Native American, 1.65% Asian, 0.03% Pacific Islander, 1.98% from other races, and 1.29% from two or more races. Hispanic or Latino of any race were 7.82% of the population.

There were 6,182 households, of which 31.6% had children under the age of 18 living with them, 59.8% were married couples living together, 9.9% had a female householder with no husband present, and 27.0% were non-families. 24.1% of all households were made up of individuals, and 12.4% had someone living alone who was 65 years of age or older. The average household size was 2.52 and the average family size was 2.98.

In the city, the population was spread out, with 23.9% under the age of 18 (see Recreation), 8.5% from 18 to 24, 26.8% from 25 to 44, 21.6% from 45 to 64, and 19.1% who were 65 years of age or older. The median age was 39 years. For every 100 females, there were 92.5 males. For every 100 females age 18 and over, there were 88.8 males.

The median income for a household in the city was $42,692, and the median income for a family was $50,892. Males had a median income of $41,404 versus $23,493 for females. The per capita income for the city was $21,147.

Government and infrastructure
The United States Postal Service Groves Post Office is at 6230 39th Street.

The city has invested over $14,000,000 into the city infrastructure since 2003. This includes a new $6,000,000 water treatment plant as well as $5,000,000 borrowed from the TWDB to deal with inflow and infiltration issues in the waste water collection system. Substantial investments have also been made to the water distribution system and waste water treatment plant, and $2,000,000 has been allocated to streets and drainage maintenance and improvements.

Education

Primary and secondary schools
The city is primarily served by the Port Neches-Groves Independent School District. A small area of Groves is served by the Port Arthur Independent School District.

Groves Middle, Van Buren, Taft elementary, and Groves elementary are located in Groves. (PNGISD)

Colleges and universities
The Lamar University system is in nearby Beaumont. Post-secondary educational opportunities are provided to the city of Groves and surrounding areas by the main campus of Lamar University, Lamar Institute of Technology, Lamar State College at Port Arthur, and Lamar State College at Orange.

Public libraries
The Groves Public Library at 5600 West Washington Boulevard serves Groves.

In popular culture
A donut shop in Groves was a key location featured in the 2021 feature film Red Rocket starring Simon Rex and directed by Sean Baker.

Notable people
 Greg Davis, former American college football coach
 Janis Joplin, noted "Queen of the Blues", famous for her raspy voice and soulful style was a student of Thomas Jefferson High School. She lived in Groves with her parents before she broke into the rock-n-roll scene
 Mary Karr, American poet and essayist. Her memoir, The Liars Club, was based on her childhood in Groves
 Brittney Rodriguez, actress (Red Rocket), former employee at Total Petrochemicals refinery across the street from the Donut Hole

References

External links
 City of Groves official website
 Groves Chamber of Commerce and Tourist Bureau

Cities in Texas
Cities in Jefferson County, Texas
Cities in the Beaumont–Port Arthur metropolitan area